Waitstill Hastings Sharp (1 May 1902– 25 February 1983) was a Unitarian minister who was involved in humanitarian and relief work in Czechoslovakia and Southern Europe during World War II. In 2005, Sharp and his first wife Martha were named by Yad Vashem as Righteous among the Nations, the second and third of five Americans to receive this honor.

Early life and education 
Sharp was born in Boston on May 1, 1902, son of Grace Hastings and naturalist, author, and professor Dallas Lore Sharp. Through his mother, he is a descendant of Thomas Hastings, who came from the East Anglia region of England to the Massachusetts Bay Colony in 1634.

Sharp graduated from Boston University with an undergraduate degree in Economics and English in 1924, from Harvard Law School with an LL.B. in 1926, and with an M.A. from Harvard University in 1931.

On June 13, 1928, he married Martha Ingham Dickie in Rye, New Hampshire, the daughter of James Ingham and Alice Whalen, both immigrants from England who settled in Rhode Island. The ceremony was presided over by his father. A social worker involved with local internationalist and peace groups, Dickie remained his ministry partner throughout his outreach and rescue work in Europe during the Second World War.

Career 
In his third year of law school, Sharp got to know Eugene Shippen, National Director of Religious Education for the American Unitarian Association (AUA), and minister of Second Church in Boston, and later became part-time director of religious education at Second Church.

In 1933 he was ordained a Unitarian minister, and he became the pastor at a small church in Meadville, Pennsylvania. In April 1936, he was appointed pastor at the Unitarian Church of Wellesley Hills in Wellesley, Massachusetts.

World War II rescue work 

The Sharps were recruited by Reverend Everett Baker of the AUA to accept a posting in Czechoslovakia, as representatives of a new program to help endangered refugees, initiated by Robert Dexter. Beginning in 1939, Sharp and his wife administered relief to hundreds of endangered Jews and other refugees in Prague.

In the following year, Waitstill and Martha traveled to southern Europe to continue a relief and rescue program for endangered refugees as representatives of the newly formed Unitarian Service Committee. While visiting southern France, Waitstill worked closely with the World YMCA to help Czech servicemen escape from Vichy France. He also forged a collaboration with Varian Fry to look after Fry's refugee clients in Lisbon. In this capacity, Martha and Waitstill personally escorted the novelist Lion Feuchtwanger from Marseille, France, on his journey to America.

Personal life
The Sharps had two children, Waitstill Hastings Jr. born in November 1931 and Martha Sharp Joukowsky, born in September 1936. The couple separated after World War II, and were divorced in 1954. Waitstill remarried on June 24, 1957, in Chicago, Illinois to Monica Clark. He died in Greenfield, Massachusetts on February 25, 1983.

Legacy 
An educational curriculum including the Sharps is featured at the United States Holocaust Memorial Museum.

The World War II work of the Sharps, including information about the context of their work among other relief workers, is detailed in a book by Susan Elisabeth Subak, Rescue and Flight, published in 2010.

A documentary film, Defying the Nazis: The Sharps' War, recounting the experiences of Waitstill and Martha Sharp, was co-directed by Ken Burns and the couple's grandson, Artemis Joukowsky III, of Sherborn, Massachusetts.

Honours and decorations

Yad Vashem
On 9 September 2005, Martha and Waitstill Sharp were named by Yad Vashem as Righteous among the Nations, the second and third Americans to receive this honor (the first being Varian Fry).

Decorations
 : Officer of the Order of the White Lion (1946)

References

Further reading 
 
 
   
 

1902 births
1983 deaths
Clergy from Boston
American Righteous Among the Nations
Harvard Law School alumni
Boston University College of Arts and Sciences alumni
Officers of the Order of the White Lion
20th-century American clergy